Hadri may refer to:
Enver Hadri, Albanian activist
Hadri, Iran, a village in Hamadan Province, Iran